Lycoming is a hamlet in Oswego County, New York, United States. Lycoming has a post office with ZIP code 13093, which opened on July 31, 1882.

References

Hamlets in Oswego County, New York
Hamlets in New York (state)